Glenville, Nova Scotia may refer to:

 Glenville, Cumberland County, Nova Scotia
 Glenville, Inverness County, Nova Scotia